Princess Yoshiko (姝子内親王; December 7, 1141 – July 20, 1176), later Takamatsu-in (高松院), was a Japanese princess, and an empress consort of her nephew Emperor Nijō. 

She was the daughter of Emperor Toba and Fujiwara no Nariko. She was thus the paternal aunt of her husband, though he was only two years younger than she.

Notes

Japanese princesses
Japanese empresses
Japanese Buddhist nuns
12th-century Buddhist nuns
1141 births
1176 deaths
Daughters of emperors